Journey Beyond is the business name (together with more than a dozen other related names) of Experience Australia Group Pty Ltd, a private equity-owned company known mainly for operating Australian interstate experiential tourism trains (The Ghan, the Indian Pacific, The Overland, and the Great Southern). , the company was a diversified tourism business based in Adelaide, South Australia, with interests in cruise and air tourism in addition to rail. In January 2022, the United States travel company the Hornblower Group acquired the business from Quadrant Private Equity, which had owned it since 2016.

History 
Before the 1990s, the government-owned Australian National Railways Commission, trading as Australian National, was the owner and operator of Australia's interstate railways and freight and passenger trains. From 1996 to 1998, Australian National was broken up and in 1997 its interstate passenger trains — The Ghan, Indian Pacific and The Overland — were sold to Great Southern Rail (GSR), a consortium of GB Railways, Legal & General, Macquarie Bank, RailAmerica, G13 Pty Ltd and Serco. Included in the sale were 186 items of rolling stock, mainly former Commonwealth Railways stainless steel carriages and the Adelaide Parklands Terminal and Alice Springs railway station. In 1999, Serco bought all the shares from its consortium partners, becoming the sole owner. GSR owned the passenger car fleet and provided services; Pacific National provided the motive power.

Between 2008 and 2012, Great Southern Rail also operated The Southern Spirit as a luxury cruising train service offering eight luxury rail cruises on a variety of outback Australian train routes. 

In 2015, Serco sold the business to private equity company Allegro Funds which only a year later sold its assets to Quadrant Private Equity.

In 2019, Great Southern Rail was rebranded as Journey Beyond Rail Expeditions and Great Southern became the name of a train running between Adelaide and Brisbane. Subsequently the brand name reverted to Journey Beyond.

Acquisitions since 2015 included Cruise Whitsundays and Rottnest Express, the Eureka Tower Skydeck, Horizontal Falls Seaplane Adventures, Outback Spirit Tours, Sal Salis Ningaloo Reef and Darwin Harbour Cruises. , it was Australia's largest experiential tourism business. 

In January 2022, Quadrant Private Equity sold its 13 brands, including the trains, for a reported AU$600 million. The buyer was the Hornblower Group, a cruise and tour company based in San Francisco, which operates from 125 American cities and whose businesses include Hornblower Cruises.

References 

Interstate rail in Australia
Passenger railway companies of Australia
Trans-Australian Railway
Railway companies established in 1997
Australian companies established in 1997
Lachlan Shire